Shantanu Sharad Sugwekar (born 18 December 1966) is a former Indian first-class cricketer who played for his home state Maharashtra from 1987 to 2001. Despite his first-class average of 63.10, Sugwekar never appeared in a Test for India, thus making him the only non-international in the history of cricket to play at least 50 first-class innings and finish his career averaging over 60.

He was a middle order batsman and represented India's Under-19s team in their 1986/87 tour of Australia. In Indian first-class cricket during his first two seasons he amassed 903 runs at an average of 129. This included an innings of 299 not out in a Ranji Trophy match against Madhya Pradesh. Maharashtra's last batsman Anil Walhekar made 38 in a last wicket partnership of 102, but it wasn't enough to see his teammate through to a triple hundred. Sugwekar remains the only batsman to have 299 not out as his highest first-class score.

Sugwekar captained Maharashtra in three Ranji Trophy campaigns from 1995/96 to 1997/98 and also served as captain of West Zone on occasions during the early 1990s. His best first-class season in runs scored came in 1996/97 when he made 928 runs at 71.38. Also a handy off spinner, his 18 first-class wickets include Rahul Dravid and Raman Lamba.

Sugwekar spent one season as an overseas professional for Corstorphine Cricket Club in Edinburgh, Scotland in the late 1980s. He bowled medium pace and batted in the top order, scoring more than one century.

References
Notes

References

External links

1966 births
Living people
Indian cricketers
Maharashtra cricketers
West Zone cricketers